The 2011 Billboard Latin Music Awards were held on Thursday April 28, 2011 at the BankUnited Center at the University of Miami in Coral Gables, Florida. It is produced and broadcast lived on Telemundo network. The nominees were announced on Thursday February 10, 2011.

Performers
Enrique Iglesias featuring Wisin & Yandel — "No Me Digas Que No / Tonight (I'm Lovin' You)"
Lucero — "Esta Vez La Primera Soy Yo"
Cristian Castro and José José — "Lo Pasado, Pasado"
Banda el Recodo — "Dime Que Me Quieres"
Juanes — "Regalito"
Dyland & Lenny featuring Arcángel — "Caliente"
Chino & Nacho — "Niña Bonita"
Camila — "Entre Tus Alas"
Fidel Rueda — "Me Encantaria"
Roberto Tapia — "Me Duele"
Gloria Trevi — "Me Río de Ti"
Don Omar and Lucenzo — "Danza Kuduro" and "Taboo"
Emmanuel — La Chica de Humo"
Luis Fonsi — "Gritar"
Maná — "Lluvia al Corazón"
Marc Anthony — "A Quien Quiero Mentirle"
Jencarlos Canela featuring Pitbull — "Mi Corazón Insiste / Tu Cuerpo"
Pitbull featuring T-Pain — Bon, Bon / Hey Baby (Drop It to the Floor)"

Presenters

 Ximena Navarrete
 Daddy Yankee
 Tercer Cielo
 María Celeste Arrarás
 Gaby Espino
 Angélica María
 Conjunto Primavera
 Christian Daniel
 Sophia Del Carmen
 Vicente Garcia
 Max Santos
 Lenny Santos
 Carmen Villalobos
 Daniel Sarcos
 Rafael Amaya
 Andrés Cantor
 Lena
 R.K.M & Ken-Y

 Gabriel Porras
 Catherine Siachoque
 Maritza Rodríguez
 Miguel Varoni
 Natalia Jiménez
 Alexis & Fido
 Carmen Dominicci
 Arthur Hanlon
 Melina León
 Frankie J
 Crash Barrera
 Yarel
 Ana Isabelle
 Joey Montana
 Enrique Acevedo
 Penélope Menchaca
 Cristina Urgel
 Banda Los Recoditos

Special awards

Lifetime achievement award
 Emmanuel

Spirit of Hope Award
 Gloria Estefan

Your World Award (Premio Tu Mundo)
 Aventura

Awards

Hot Latin Songs

Latin Artist of the Year
 Aventura
 Camila
 Enrique Iglesias
 Shakira

Latin Artist of the Year, New
 Banda Los Recoditos
 Chino & Nacho
 Prince Royce
 Voz de Mando

Hot Latin Song of the Year
 Banda el Recodo — "Dime Que Me Quieres"
 Enrique Iglesias featuring Juan Luis Guerra — "Cuando Me Enamoro"
 La Arrolladora Banda El Limón — "Nina de Mi Corazon"
 La Original Banda El Limón — "Al Menos"

Hot Latin Song of the Year, Vocal Event
 Don Omar and Lucenzo — "Danza Kuduro"
 Enrique Iglesias featuring Juan Luis Guerra — "Cuando Me Enamoro"
 Enrique Iglesias featuring Pitbull — "I Like It"
 Shakira featuring Dizzee Rascal and El Cata — "Loca"

Hot Latin Songs Artist of the Year, Male
 Daddy Yankee
 Enrique Iglesias
 Larry Hernandez
 Prince Royce

Hot Latin Songs Artist of the Year, Female
 Ivy Queen
 Lady Gaga
 Shakira
 Thalia

Hot Latin Songs Artist of the Year, Duo or Group
 Aventura
 Banda el Recodo
 Camila
 La Arrolladora Banda El Limón

Hot Latin Songs Label of the Year
 Disa
 Fonovisa
 Sony Music Latin
 Universal Music Latino

Crossover Artist of the Year
 Lady Gaga
 Rihanna
 Taio Cruz
 Usher

Top Latin Albums

Latin Album of the Year
 Camila — Dejarte de Amar
 Enrique Iglesias — Euphoria
 Marc Anthony — Iconos
 Shakira — Sale el Sol

Top Latin Albums Artist of the Year, Male
 Enrique Iglesias
 Larry Hernandez
 Marc Anthony
 Prince Royce

Top Latin Albums Artist of the Year, Female
 Ivy Queen
 Jenni Rivera
 Shakira
 Thalia

Top Latin Albums Artist of the Year, Duo or Group
 Aventura
 Camila
 El Trono De Mexico
 Wisin & Yandel

Top Latin Albums Label of the Year
 Capitol Latin
 Sony Music Latin
 Universal Music Latin Entertainment
 Warner Music Latina

Latin Pop

Latin Pop Airplay Song of the Year
 Camila — "Aléjate de mi"
 Camila — "Mientes"
 Chino & Nacho — "Mi Niña Bonita"
 Enrique Iglesias featuring Juan Luis Guerra — "Cuando Me Enamoro"

Latin Pop Airplay Artist of the Year, Solo
 Chayanne
 Enrique Iglesias
 Juan Luis Guerra
 Shakira

Latin Pop Airplay Artist of the Year, Duo or Group
 Aventura
 Camila
 Chino & Nacho
 Wisin & Yandel

Latin Pop Airplay Label of the Year
 Capitol Latin
 Sony Music Latin
 Universal Music Latino
 Warner Music Latina

Latin Pop Album of the Year
 Camila — Dejarte de Amar
 Enrique Iglesias — Euphoria
 Marc Anthony — Iconos
 Shakira — Sale el Sol

Latin Pop Albums Artist of the Year, Solo
 Chayanne
 Enrique Iglesias
 Marc Anthony
 Shakira

Latin Pop Albums Artist of the Year, Duo or Group
 Camila
 Cultura Profética
 Hillsong
 Tercer Cielo

Latin Pop Albums Label of the Year
 Bullseye
 Sony Music Latin
 Universal Music Latin Entertainment
 Warner Music Latina

Tropical

Tropical Airplay Song of the Year
 Aventura — "El Malo"
 Chino & Nacho — "Niña Bonita"
 Enrique Iglesias featuring Juan Luis Guerra — "Cuando Me Enamoro"
 Juan Luis Guerra — "Bachata en Fukuoka"

Tropical Airplay Artist of the Year, Solo
 Daddy Yankee
 Juan Luis Guerra
 Prince Royce
 Tito El Bambino

Tropical Airplay Artist of the Year, Duo or Group
 Aventura
 Chino & Nacho
 Jowell & Randy
 Wisin & Yandel

Tropical Airplay Label of the Year
 Premium Latin
 Sony Music Latin
 Top Stop Music
 Universal Music Latino

Tropical Album of the Year
 El Gran Combo de Puerto Rico — Sin Salsa No Hay Paraiso
 El Gran Combo de Puerto Rico — Salsa: Un Homenaje A El Gran Combo
 Juan Luis Guerra — A Son de Guerra
 Prince Royce — Prince Royce

Tropical Albums Artist of the Year, Solo
 Gilberto Santa Rosa
 Hector Acosta
 Juan Luis Guerra
 Prince Royce

Tropical Albums Artist of the Year, Duo or Group
 24 Horas
 Aventura
 El Gran Combo de Puerto Rico
 Spanish Harlem Orchestra

Tropical Albums Label of the Year
 Capitol Latin
 Popular
 Sony Music Latin
 Universal Music Latin Entertainment

Regional Mexican

Regional Mexican Song of the Year
 Banda el Recodo — "Dime Que Me Quieres"
 Banda Los Recoditos — "Ando Bien Pedo"
 El Trono de Mexico — "Te Recordare"
 La Original Banda El Limón — "Al Menos"

Regional Mexican Airplay Artist of the Year, Solo
 Espinoza Paz
 Gerardo Ortíz
 Larry Hernandez
 Pedro Fernández

Regional Mexican Airplay Artist of the Year, Duo or Group
 Banda el Recodo
 Banda Los Recoditos
 El Trono de Mexico
 La Arrolladora Banda El Limón

Regional Mexican Airplay Label of the Year
 ASL
 Disa Records
 Fonovisa Records
 Musivisa

Regional Mexican Album of the Year
 El Trono de Mexico — Quiero Decirte Que Te Amo
 The Chieftains — San Patricio
 Jenni Rivera — La Gran Señora
 Pedro Fernández — Amarte a la Antigua

Regional Mexican Albums Artist of the Year, Solo
 Espinoza Paz
 Jenni Rivera
 Larry Hernandez
 Pedro Fernández

Regional Mexican Albums Artist of the Year, Duo or Group
 Banda Los Recoditos
 El Trono de Mexico
 Los Inquietos del Norte
 Pesado

Regional Mexican Albums Label of the Year
 Concord Records
 Eagle Music
 Sony Music Latin
 Universal Music Latin Entertainment

Latin Rhythm

Latin Rhythm Airplay Song of the Year
 Daddy Yankee — "La Despedida"
 Don Omar and Lucenzo — "Danza Kuduro"
 Pitbull — "Bon, Bon"
 Tito El Bambino — "Te Pido Perdón"

Latin Rhythm Airplay Artist of the Year, Solo
 Daddy Yankee
 Don Omar 
 Pitbull
 Tito El Bambino

Latin Rhythm Airplay Artist of the Year, Duo or Group
 Chino & Nacho
 Dyland & Lenny
 Wisin & Yandel
 Zion & Lennox

Latin Rhythm Airplay Label of the Year
 Pina Records
 Siente
 Sony Music Latin
 Universal Music Latin Entertainment

Latin Rhythm Album of the Year
 Chino & Nacho — Niña Bonita
 Daddy Yankee — Mundial
 Don Omar — Don Omar Presents: Meet the Orphans
 Pitbull — Armando

Latin Rhythm Albums Artist of the Year, Solo
 Daddy Yankee
 Don Omar
 Pitbull
 Tito El Bambino

Latin Rhythm Albums Artist of the Year, Duo or Group
 Chino & Nacho
 Jowell & Randy
 R.K.M & Ken-Y
 Wisin & Yandel

Latin Rhythm Albums Label of the Year
 Capitol Latin
 Chosen Few Emerald
 Sony Music Latin
 Universal Music Latin Entertainment

Latin Touring

Latin Touring Artist of the Year
 Alejandro Sanz
 Chayanne
 Marc Anthony
 Shakira

Digital

Latin Digital Album of the Year
 Camila — Dejarte de Amar
 Enrique Iglesias — Euphoria
 Marc Anthony — Iconos
 Shakira — Sale el Sol

Latin Digital Download of the Year
 Chino & Nacho — "Mi Nina Bonita"
 Pitbull — "Bon, Bon"
 Shakira — "Waka Waka (This Time For Africa)"
 Shakira featuring El Cata — "Loca"

Latin Social Artist of the Year
 Don Omar
 Enrique Iglesias
 Pitbull
 Shakira

Songwriters/Publishers/Producers

Songwriter of the Year
 Anthony Santos
 Horacio Palencia Cisneros
 Espinoza Paz
 Daddy Yankee

Publisher of the Year
 Arpa Musical, LLC, BMI
 EMI Blackwood Music Inc., ASCAP
 Premium Latin Publishing, ASCAP
 Sony/ATV Discos Music Publishing LLC, ASCAP

Publishing Corporation of the Year
 Arpa Music
 EMI Music
 Sony/ATV Music
 Universal Music

Producer of the Year
 Alfonso Lizarraga
 Carlos Paucar
 Fernando Camacho Tirado
 Joel Lizarraga

See also
Billboard Latin Music Awards
Billboard Music Award

References

External links
2011 Official Site Latin Billboard Music Awards Nominees

Billboard Latin Music Awards
Latin Billboard Music Awards
Latin Billboard Music Awards
Latin Billboard Music Awards
Latin Billboard Music Awards